Sagarmāthā National Park is a national park in the Himalayas of eastern Nepal that is dominated by Mount Everest. In the north, it shares the international border with Qomolangma National Nature Preserve of Tibet. In the east, it is adjacent to Makalu Barun National Park, and in the south it extends to Dudh Kosi river.
It is part of the Sacred Himalayan Landscape.

Sagarmāthā is a Nepali word for Mount Everest, derived from words sagar meaning "sky" and māthā meaning "head".

History
Sagarmatha National Park was established in 1976. In 1979, it became the country's first national park that was inscribed as a Natural World Heritage Site. In January 2002, a Buffer Zone comprising  was added. Under the Buffer Zone Management Guidelines the conservation of forests, wildlife and cultural resources received top priority, followed by conservation of other natural resources and development of alternative energy.

Tourism to the area began in the early 1960s. In 2003, about 19,000 tourists arrived. As of 2005, about 3,500 Sherpa people lived in villages and seasonal settlements situated along the main tourist trails.

Landscape
The park contains the upper catchment areas of the Dudh Kosi river, Bhotekoshi river basin and the Gokyo Lakes. Other peaks above  are Lhotse, Cho Oyu, Thamserku, Nuptse, Amadablam and Pumori. Barren land above  comprises 69% of the park while 28% is grazing land and the remaining 3% is forested. Climatic zones include a forested temperate zone, a subalpine zone above , and an alpine zone above  that constitutes the upper limit of vegetation growth.

Wildlife

Flora
The forests in the subalpine belt consist of fir, Himalayan birch and rhododendron. Mosses and lichens grow above . More than 1,000 floral species were recorded in the national park.

Fauna 

Sagarmatha National Park hosts 208 bird species including Impeyan pheasant, bearded vulture, snowcock, and alpine chough, and has been identified by BirdLife International as an Important Bird Area (IBA). Ungulates include Himalayan thar, Himalayan serow and musk deer. The snow leopard inhabits elevations above , and the Indian leopard roams forests in lower elevations.

References

External links

Official UNESCO website entry

National parks of Nepal
Mount Everest
Solukhumbu District
Protected areas established in 1976
1976 establishments in Asia
1970s establishments in Nepal
Important Bird Areas of Nepal
World Heritage Sites in Nepal
1976 establishments in Nepal